Chilton was launched in 1802 in Whitby. After sailing to North America she became a West Indiaman, sailing between Britain and Jamaica. Between 1812 and 1817 or so she was a transport. Thereafter she traded to North America and more widely. In 1824 she rescued the survivors of a vessel that had foundered. She herself foundered in 1839.

Career
Chilton first appeared in Lloyd's Register (LR) in 1803.

, of Glasgow, foundered in June 1824 in the Atlantic Ocean with the loss of four of her crew. Chilton, of Whitby, rescued the surviving crew and passengers and brought them into Miramichi.

In November 1837 Thomas Chilton transferred Chiltons registry to Liverpool.

LR carries minimal data from 1834 on. Still, newspapers reported that Chilton sailed to Pernambuco and Maranhan, Brazil. in 1837 and 1838.

Fate
On 15 November 1839 Chilton sprang a leak and became waterlogged in the Atlantic Ocean with the loss of five of her thirteen crew. City of York rescued the survivors on 30 November.

Notes, citations and references
Notes

Citations

References
  

1802 ships
Ships built in Whitby
Age of Sail merchant ships of England
Maritime incidents in June 1824
Maritime incidents in November 1839